The PSA World Tour 2011 is the international squash tour organised circuit organized by the Professional Squash Association (PSA) for the 2011 squash season. The most important tournament in the series is the World Open held in Rotterdam in the Netherlands. The tour features three categories of regular events, World Series, which feature the highest prize money and the best fields, International and Challenger. The Tour is concluded by the PSA World Series Finals, the end of season championship for the top 8 rated players.

2011 Calendar

Key

World Open

PSA World Series
Prize money: $115,000 and more

International
Prize money: between $25,000 and $114,999

January

February

March

April

May

June

July

September

October

November

Year end world top 10 players

Retirements
Following is a list of notable players (winners of a main tour title, and/or part of the PSA World Rankings top 30 for at least one month) who announced their retirement from professional squash, became inactive, or were permanently banned from playing, during the 2011 season:

 David Palmer (born 28 June 1976 in the Lithgow, New South Wales, Australia) joined the pro tour in 1994, reached the world no. 1 ranking in September 2001. Keeping the spot for four month in 2001. He won two World Open titles in 2002 against John White and in 2006 against Grégory Gaultier. The Australian also won four British Open titles in 2001, 2003, 2004 and 2008. He retired in November after losing in quarter final of the World Open.
 Stewart Boswell (born 29 July 1978 in Canberra, Australia) joined the pro tour in 1996, reached the singles no. 4 spot in May 2002. He won 9 PSA World Tour titles including three Australian Open, two Berkshire Open and reached, in 2002, the final of the prestigious US Open lost against David Palmer. He retired in December after losing in quarter final of the Kuwait PSA Cup.
 Stefan Casteleyn (born 25 February 1974 in Brussels, Belgium) joined the pro tour in 1993, reached the singles no. 7 spot in December 1999. He won a total of nineteen Belgium Nationals. He retired the PSA World Tour in December 2011.

See also
PSA World Series 2011
2011 Men's World Team Squash Championships
PSA World Tour
PSA World Rankings
PSA World Series Finals
PSA World Open
2011 Men's World Team

References

External links
PSA World Tour

PSA World Tour seasons
2011 in squash